FCHS may refer to:

Schools
 Falls Church High School, in West Falls Church, Virginia, United States
 Farmington Central High School (disambiguation)
 Fayette County High School (Georgia), United States
 Finchley Catholic High School, in London
 First Coast High School, in Jacksonville, Florida, United States
 Floyd Central High School (Indiana), in Floyds Knobs, Indiana, United States
 Floyd Central High School (Kentucky), in Floyd County, Kentucky, United States
 Floyd County High School, in Floyd County, Virginia, United States
 Fluvanna County High School, in Palmyra, Virginia, United States
 Ford City High School, in Ford City, Pennsylvania, United States
 Forrest City High School, in Forrest City, Arkansas, United States
 Forsyth Central High School, in Cumming, Georgia, United States
 Fort Campbell High School, in Fort Campbell, Kentucky, United States
 Fort Collins High School, in Fort Collins, Colorado, United States
 Fox Creek High School, in North Augusta, South Carolina, United States
 Frank Church High School, in Boise, Idaho, United States
 Frankfort Community High School, in West Frankfort, Illinois, United States
 Franklin Central High School, in Indianapolis, Indiana, United States
 Franklin County High School (disambiguation)
 Franklin Community High School, in Franklin, Indiana, United States
 Freeburg Community High School, in Freeburg, Illinois, United States
 Fresno Christian High School, in Fresno, California, United States
 Frontier Central High School, in Hamburg, New York, United States

Other
 French Colonial Historical Society, see Michael G. Vann

See also 
 FCH (disambiguation)